The United Nations System Staff College (UNSSC) is a UN organization that serves the personnel of the United Nations and its affiliates via interagency learning and training.

The organization aims to contribute to a more effective, results-oriented and agile United Nations through learning, training and knowledge dissemination.

Since their creation in 2015, UNSSC's learning and knowledge efforts have been geared towards enabling the United Nations system in identifying innovative approaches to deliver on the requirements of the challenges posed by the 2030 Agenda for Sustainable Development.

History 
The idea of creating an entity to train the employees of the United Nations was bounced around since at least 1969, when the feasibility of creating a staff college began to be explored. In 1971, the General Assembly approved, in principle, the creation of a new staff college for United Nations employees. However, its formal creation could not be approved by the body until financial resources could be found.

In 1993, Secretary-Generaral Boutros-Ghali created a joint United Nations-International Labour Organization team to seriously consider the creation of a staff college, tasking it with creating a concrete proposal. The proposal of the team was accepted in 1995.  A UN Staff College Project was inaugurated in 1997 at the ILO Turin Campus, with an inaugural workshop organized by the UN Office for the Coordination of Humanitarian Affairs and United Nations Development Programme, opened by Secretary-General Annan on 12 April 1997. The subject of the DHA-UNDP Workshop was "Building Bridges between Relief and Development", 12 to 17 April 1997, and it coincided with a meeting of the heads of UN agencies, the United Nations Chief Executives' Board for Coordination (CEB) (then known as the Advisory Committee on Coordination) who attended the inauguration. Based on experience of training activities over the following years,  an independent team evaluated the plan for the college in August 2000 and recommended that the United Nations formally draw up a statute for the formal creation of the staff college.

The college was formally created by the General Assembly on 20 December 2000 via Res. 55/207. This resolution called for "an institution for system-wide knowledge management, training and learning for the staff of the United Nations system." It also specified that special attention be paid to the areas of economic and social development, peace and security and the internal management of the United Nations system.

On 12 July 2001, the General Assembly approved the Statute of the College via Res. 55/278. This Statute laid out the College's objectives, governance structure, finances and staffing criteria, among other things. The Resolution also called the College a source of "continuous learning for the staff of the United Nations system."

Mandate and Vision 
The mandate of the UNSSC is "To serve as a system-wide knowledge management and learning institution, with a view to fostering a cohesive management culture across the UN system."

The Vision of the UNSSC is "To provide the skills and knowledge to empower the most valuable resource of the UN system: our people."

Campuses 
As the United Nations is a global organization and its employees are posted around the world, the UNSSC works to ensure equal access by hosting programs in a variety of locations. The UNSSC has two physical campuses, the first in Turin, Italy, and the second in Bonn, Germany. It also hosts events at United Nations Headquarters in New York, at regional and country levels and online via its online campus.

The Turin campus, which also acts as the Headquarters of the UNSSC, is the only residential campus of the United Nations.

The Bonn campus was opened in 2016 and houses the UNSSC's Knowledge Centre for Sustainable Development. This Centre will play a key role, along with the United Nations Lab for Organizational Change and Knowledge, in building up the technical, managerial and leadership capacities of the United Nations staff to address the Sustainable Development Goals.

The UNSSC also hosts classes online via its "UN Knowledge Campus." This online campus allows access to United Nations employees who do not have the resources to attend courses at one of the physical campuses.

Leadership 
The governing body of the UNSSC is the Board of Governors. They approve the overall work program, as well as deal with the Colleges budget. Members of the Board act as "ambassadors" for the College by promoting its work at inter-agency gatherings and throughout the United Nations system. The following identifies the members of the Board:

Chair

Members of the Board

Ex-officio Members

References

External links 
Official site

Educational institutions established in 2002
Universities in Italy
Organisations based in Turin
Education in Turin
United Nations General Assembly
United Nations Development Group
Italy and the United Nations
Education in Bonn
2002 establishments in Italy